The M-18 main road is a main road in Bosnia and Herzegovina. The road is a part of European route E762. It runs from Serbian border in Rača border crossing near Velino Selo towards Montenegrin border in Hum near Foča.

Highways in Bosnia and Herzegovina